Mohammed Bin Mohammed Noor Adam Hawsawi (born 26 February 1978), commonly known as Mohammed Noor, also known by his short name Noor, is a retired footballer from Saudi Arabia who played as an attacking midfielder. He played almost all of his career for Saudi Professional League side Al Ittihad. In 2013, he was forced out of Al-Ittihad to a series of financial epidemics there, and as for that, he moved to Al-Nassr club for one football season. Still, Noor is considered to be one of the best players to ever play in Asia, mostly due to his excellent distribution, ball control, and dribbling skills.

Club career statistics
''As of 3 March 2023.

 Assist Goals

International career
His first appearance with the national football team was in the 1999 FIFA Confederations Cup in the semi - finals against Brazil. Noor played for Saudi Arabia in the 2002 World Cup, without any real success. He fared better in the 2005 FIFA Club World Championship in Japan for Al-Ittihad. While playing for the Saudi national team on 14 June 2006, Noor managed to deliver a powerful performance while also having come down with a bad case of influenza. During the second half of the Saudi Arabian game against Tunisia (their opening match of the 2006 FIFA World Cup), he provided Al-Qahtani with the winning assist which secured Saudi Arabia's first goal of the match, bringing the score from a 1–0 lead for Tunisia to a 1–1 tie.

International goals

Honours

Club
Al-Ittihad
 AFC Champions League (2): 2004, 2005
 Asian Cup Winners Cup (1): 1999
 Saudi Professional League (7): 1997, 1999, 2000, 2001, 2003, 2007, 2009
 Saudi Crown Prince Cup (3): 1997, 2001, 2004
 Prince Faisal Bin Fahd Cup (2): 1997, 1999
 Arab Champions League (1): 2005
 Gulf Club Champions Cup (1): 1999
 Saudi-Egyptian Super Cup (2): 2001, 2003
 King Cup of Champions (1): 2010

Al-Nassr
 Saudi Crown Prince Cup (1): 2014
 Saudi Professional League (1): 2014

International
Saudi Arabia
 Arab Nations Cup (1): 2002
 Arabian Gulf Cup (1): 2003-04

Individual
 Arabian Footballer of the Year: 2003
 Arab Nations Cup 2002 - Most Valuable player
 Best Player In Saudi Premier League: 2009
 Arab Player of the Decade (MBC group poll): 2000–2010
 Asian Footballer of the Year Nominee: 2009
 Best player in Saudi Arabia: 2010
 MVP in the Asian Champions League: 2005
 Saudi portadol (2018-2019)
 Saudi portadol goalscorer

References

External links
 
 
 

1978 births
Living people
Saudi Arabian Muslims
Saudi Arabian footballers
Saudi Arabia international footballers
1999 FIFA Confederations Cup players
2002 FIFA World Cup players
2006 FIFA World Cup players
2000 AFC Asian Cup players
Ittihad FC players
Sportspeople from Mecca
Al Nassr FC players
Association football midfielders
Saudi Professional League players
Saudi Arabian sportspeople in doping cases
Doping cases in association football